Lebucquière is a commune in the Pas-de-Calais department in the Hauts-de-France region of France.

Geography

Population

Places of interest
 The church of St.Jacques, rebuilt along with the rest of the village, following World War I.
 The Commonwealth War Graves Commission cemetery.
 The building across from the green in Lebucquière used to have the text "CAFE DE LA PLACE" written on it when it was a cafe. When the building became residential, the text was changed to "FACE A LA PLACE."
 The house directly in front of the green of Lebucquière was the home of Christian Carion, a famous French director.

See also
Communes of the Pas-de-Calais department

References

External links

 The CWGC cemetery

Communes of Pas-de-Calais